Hellmut R. Toelken (born 1939) is a South Australian botanist. He retired in December 2008 from the position of senior biologist at the State Herbarium of South Australia, but remains an honorary research associate. Earlier he was with the Botanical Research Institute, Department of Agricultural Technical Services, Pretoria, S Africa.

His interests include the genera Kunzea, Hibbertia, Crassula and Carpobrotus. He is the author of the book A Revision of the Genus Crassula in Southern Africa.

References

Living people
20th-century Australian botanists
1939 births
21st-century Australian botanists